Arigiin River is a river in the Khövsgöl aimag of Mongolia.
It starts next to Döm Mountain in the confluence of two smaller rivers at the border between Alag-Erdene and Chandmani-Öndör sums, continuing through the latter.
It discharges into the Üür River next to the Tsagaan-Üür sum center.

References

See also
List of rivers of Mongolia

Rivers of Mongolia